Udeh-ye Sofla (also Romanized as ‘Ūdeh-ye Soflá and ‘Owdeh-ye Soflá; also known as ‘Owdeh, ‘Owdeh-ye Pā’īn, and ‘Ūdeh-ye Pā’īn) is a village in Abdoliyeh-ye Gharbi Rural District, in the Central District of Ramshir County, Khuzestan Province, Iran. At the 2006 census, its population was 111, in 21 families.

References 

Populated places in Ramshir County